He Xinjie (born 17 February 2002), known in Spain as Valerón, is a Chinese footballer currently playing as a midfielder for Guangzhou.

Club career
Born in Jinjiang, Fujian, He started playing football at the age of six. At the age of eleven, he was approached by Hangzhou Greentown, Shandong Luneng and the Evergrande Football School, with He opting to join the latter. After one Chinese FA Cup appearance for Guangzhou, Wu moved to Spain to join Sporting de Gijón, alongside teammates Jiang Weilang and Wu Junjie. In his first season, he was loaned to affiliate club Gijón Industrial in the Tercera División RFEF.

He returned to Guangzhou in 2022, making his debut in the Chinese Super League on 23 August of the same year.

International career
He has represented China at under-16 and under-19 level.

Career statistics

Club
.

References

2002 births
Living people
People from Jinjiang, Fujian
Footballers from Fujian
Chinese footballers
China youth international footballers
Association football midfielders
Tercera Federación players
Chinese Super League players
Guangzhou F.C. players
Sporting de Gijón players
Chinese expatriate footballers
Chinese expatriate sportspeople in Spain
Expatriate footballers in Spain